Dušan Markešević (born 13 February 1986) is a Serbian long-distance runner who specialized in the various long-distance track and cross country disciplines.

Running career

Youth career
At the age of 15, Markešević set the 3000-meter national record for the 15-year-old age group with a time of 8:51.58.  Markešević made his international debut at the 2003 European Youth Summer Olympic Festival in Paris, France, where he finished second overall in the 3000 meter race. At the 2005 IAAF World Cross Country Championships, Markešević finished in 36th place of 125 finishers in the junior men's 8K race. At the end of the same year, he finished in third overall in the junior men's race at the 2005 European Cross Country Championships. At the 2006 European Cross Country Championships, Markešević placed in second overall against an extremely competitive U23 field, finishing ahead of Daniele Meucci and Yevgeny Rybakov.

Senior career
Markešević made his senior debut at the 2007 Summer Universiade, where he fielded in the men's 5000 metres and the men's 1500 metres. The following year, he finished in second overall for the 5000-meter race at the 2008 European Cup.

References

Serbian male long-distance runners
1986 births
Living people
Sportspeople from Čačak
Competitors at the 2007 Summer Universiade